The Polster Valley Wheel House lies in the Polster valley about three kilometres from Altenau in the Upper Harz region of Germany and is surrounded by a campsite.

The wheel house was built in 1729 and provided power for the pumping station of the Polsterberg Pumphouse (Polsterberger Hubhaus) with two water wheels until the early 20th century.

Upper Harz Water Regale